Wabash Avenue may refer to:

 Wabash Avenue (film)
 Wabash Avenue (Baltimore)
 Wabash Avenue Bridge, Chicago
 Wabash Avenue YMCA, Chicago